The 1987 Princeton Tigers football team was an American football team that represented Princeton University during the 1987 NCAA Division I-AA football season. Princeton tied for fourth in the Ivy League.

In their first year under head coach Steve Tosches, the Tigers compiled a 6–4 record and outscored opponents 230 to 155. Matthew B. Whalen was the team captain.

Princeton's 4–3 conference record tied for fourth in the Ivy League standings. The Tigers outscored Ivy opponents 157 to 95. 

Princeton played its home games at Palmer Stadium on the university campus in Princeton, New Jersey.

Schedule

References

Princeton
Princeton Tigers football seasons
Princeton Tigers football